Temperzone is a privately owned large-sized organisation specialising in manufacturing air conditioning units and ventilation equipment for both residential and commercial markets. It operates in New Zealand, Australia, Singapore and other parts of Asia. Temperzone has over 500 employees.

History
The Temperzone Group was originally formed in New Zealand in 1956 by founder Eric L. Kendall. Temperzone's presence in Australia was due to the acquisition of Bradway Engineering in 1985. Today, the business is run by Governing Director & CEO Les Kendall.

General
It is one of the few manufacturers in Australia & New Zealand that still manufactures within those countries. It is also one of the only companies in the manufacturing industry that has its management structure within Australasia.

Temperzone was the first manufacturer to use R-410A refrigerant (with a Zero ODP) as a standard across its entire split-ducted, rooftop package & water source heat pump range.

Temperzone is the largest air conditioning manufacturer in Australia and New Zealand.

Hitachi Strategic Alliance
On 3 August 2009, Temperzone Australia and Hitachi Appliances announced a strategic alliance which allowed Hitachi air conditioning products to be exclusively distributed within the Australian & New Zealand markets by Temperzone.

2020 Layoffs
Temperzone laid off 85 of its employees after New Zealand's nationwide lockdown.

See also
Air conditioning
HVAC
Refrigerant

External links
Temperzone Official Website
Temperzone Company Linkedin Page
Hitachi Cooling & Heating Australia
Hitachi Cooling & Heating New Zealand

References 

Manufacturing companies of Australia
Manufacturing companies based in Auckland
Heating, ventilation, and air conditioning companies
Manufacturing companies established in 1956
New Zealand brands